Ethmia tricula is a moth in the family Depressariidae. It is found in California, United States.

The ground color of the forewings and hindwings is uniform, dull gray-brown including the fringes.

References

Moths described in 1973
tricula